The 1st season of Gwiazdy tańczą na lodzie, the Polish edition of Dancing on Ice, started on September 28, 2007 and ended on December 7, 2007. It was broadcast by TVP2. Tatiana Okupnik and Maciej Kurzajewski as the hosts, and the judges were: Dorota Rabczewska, Włodzimierz Szaranowicz, Maria Zuchowicz and Igor Kryszyłowicz.

Couples

Scores

Red numbers indicate the lowest score for each week.
Green numbers indicate the highest score for each week.
 indicates the couple eliminated that week.
 indicates the returning couple that finished in the bottom two (Skate Off).
 indicates the winning couple of the week.
 indicates the runner-up of the week.
 indicates the couple withdrew.

The Best Score (10.0)

Episodes

Week 1 – Prologue
Individual judges scores in charts below (given in parentheses) are listed in this order from left to right: Włodzimierz Szaranowicz, Dorota Rabczewska, Maria Zuchowicz and Igor Kryszyłowicz.

Running order

Week 2 – Love Songs
Individual judges scores in charts below (given in parentheses) are listed in this order from left to right: Włodzimierz Szaranowicz, Dorota Rabczewska, Maria Zuchowicz and Igor Kryszyłowicz.

Running order

Skate OFF
Running order

Week 3 – Vacation
Individual judges scores in charts below (given in parentheses) are listed in this order from left to right: Włodzimierz Szaranowicz, Dorota Rabczewska, Maria Zuchowicz and Igor Kryszyłowicz.

Running order

Skate OFF
Running order

Week 4 – Music Idols
Individual judges scores in charts below (given in parentheses) are listed in this order from left to right: Włodzimierz Szaranowicz, Dorota Rabczewska, Maria Zuchowicz and Igor Kryszyłowicz.

Running order

Skate OFF
Running order

Week 5 – The Biggest Hits of All-Time
Individual judges scores in charts below (given in parentheses) are listed in this order from left to right: Włodzimierz Szaranowicz, Dorota Rabczewska, Maria Zuchowicz and Igor Kryszyłowicz.

Running order

Skate OFF
Running order

Week 6 – Movies
Individual judges scores in charts below (given in parentheses) are listed in this order from left to right: Włodzimierz Szaranowicz, Dorota Rabczewska, Maria Zuchowicz and Igor Kryszyłowicz.

Running order

Skate OFF
Running order

Week 7 – Sweet 16
Individual judges scores in charts below (given in parentheses) are listed in this order from left to right: Włodzimierz Szaranowicz, Dorota Rabczewska, Maria Zuchowicz and Igor Kryszyłowicz.

Running order

Skate OFF
Running order

Week 8 – Disco & Number-one Hits
Individual judges scores in charts below (given in parentheses) are listed in this order from left to right: Włodzimierz Szaranowicz, Dorota Rabczewska, Maria Zuchowicz and Igor Kryszyłowicz.

Running order

Skate OFF
Running order

Week 9 – Classic Rock & 80's
Individual judges scores in charts below (given in parentheses) are listed in this order from left to right: Włodzimierz Szaranowicz, Dorota Rabczewska, Maria Zuchowicz and Igor Kryszyłowicz.

Running order

Skate OFF
Running order

Week 10 – Serious Music & Musicals
Individual judges scores in charts below (given in parentheses) are listed in this order from left to right: Włodzimierz Szaranowicz, Dorota Rabczewska, Maria Zuchowicz and Igor Kryszyłowicz.

Running order

Skate OFF
Running order

Week 11 – Bands, The Best Dance, Doda Songs
Individual judges scores in charts below (given in parentheses) are listed in this order from left to right: Włodzimierz Szaranowicz, Dorota Rabczewska, Maria Zuchowicz and Igor Kryszyłowicz.

Running order

Episode results

Rating Figures

1
2007 Polish television seasons